Mozart and the Wolf Gang is a 1991 novel by Anthony Burgess about the life and world of Wolfgang Amadeus Mozart. Published in the U.K. under this title, in the U.S. it was published as On Mozart: A Paean for Wolfgang, Being a Celestial Colloquy, an Opera Libretto, a Film Script, a Schizophrenic Dialogue, a Bewildered Rumination.

Among other things, it attempts to fictionalize Mozart's Symphony No.40.

This is one of numerous Burgess books in which music figures prominently, others being A Vision of Battlements; The Worm and the Ring; The Malayan Trilogy; A Clockwork Orange, especially for its use of Beethoven's Symphony No. 9; Honey for the Bears; Napoleon Symphony: A Novel in Four Movements, which is modeled structurally on Beethoven’s Symphony No. 3; The End of the World News; Any Old Iron; The Devil's Mode and Other Stories; The Pianoplayers, about the music hall era; and Byrne: A Novel.

Mozart and the Wolf Gang brings to life various composers through fictional representations: Prokofiev, Gershwin, Elgar, Rossini, Mendelssohn, Berlioz, Wagner and Schoenberg feature in various dialogues.

References 

1991 British novels
Novels by Anthony Burgess
Novels about composers
Hutchinson (publisher) books
Wolfgang Amadeus Mozart in fiction
Cultural depictions of Richard Wagner
George Gershwin